Cessford is a hamlet and former barony about a mile south of the B6401 road, in the Scottish Borders area of Scotland. The placename is from Gaelic 'ceis' and means 'the wattled causeway over the ford'; spellings vary between Cesfuird, Cesford, Cessfoord, Cessfuird, and Cessfurde.

Places nearby include Crailing, Eckford, Kelso, Morebattle, Nisbet, and Oxnam

Cessford Castle is a ruined castle nearby.

Cessford Burn is a tributary of the Kale Water.

See also
List of places in the Scottish Borders

References
 Scott, T (1897) 'Collection of flint arrow-heads, spearheads, knives, scrapers, borers, flakes - about 600 in all - from Craigsfordmains mostly', Hist Berwickshire Natur Club, vol.15,1, pages 166–7.

External links

CANMORE/RCAHMS record of Cessford
The Former Parish of Mow or Molle / Ker family
George Crabb, Google book: Universal Historical Dictionary, the Kers of Cessford and of Fernihirst
Kale Water Community Council

Villages in the Scottish Borders